Francesco Rodio (born 5 April 2001) is an Italian footballer who plays as a midfielder for  club Viterbese on loan from Pro Vercelli.

Club career
On 17 September 2020 he joined Pro Vercelli on loan. On 1 February 2021 he was sent on a new loan to Fano.

On 5 July 2021, he returned to Pro Vercelli on a permanent basis. On 31 August 2021, he was loaned to Fermana. On 1 September 2022, Rodio moved on a new loan to Viterbese.

Club statistics

Club

References

2001 births
Living people
People from Crotone
Footballers from Calabria
Sportspeople from the Province of Crotone
Italian footballers
Association football midfielders
Serie B players
Serie C players
F.C. Crotone players
F.C. Pro Vercelli 1892 players
Alma Juventus Fano 1906 players
Fermana F.C. players
U.S. Viterbese 1908 players